Felice  may refer to:

 Felice, a name used as both a given name, masculine or feminine, and a surname
 Felice, a 1971 short silent 
 Felice...Felice..., a 1998 Dutch drama film directed by Peter Delpeut
 Campo Felice, a karstic plateau in the central Apennines,
 Castel Felice, a SITMAR (Società Italiana Trasporti Marittima) Line liner
 Nonno Felice, an Italian sitcom 
 Porta Felice, a monumental city gate of Palermo

See also 
 Felix (disambiguation)
 De Felice, a surname
 San Felice (disambiguation)